Gershon Beresford Onesimus Collier (February 16, 1927 – May 25, 1994) was a Sierra Leonean diplomat, chief justice of Sierra Leone and educator.

Career 
He was called to the English Bar at the Middle Temple Inns of Court, London
In 1958 when Albert Margai left the Sierra Leone People's Party, Gershon Collier was one of the supporters and was a member of that People's National Party's first executive committee.
In 1961 he became Sierra Leone's first permanent representative to the Headquarters of the United Nations in New York City.
 On October 16, 1963, he was designated concurrently ambassador in Washington, D.C. war he was concurrently accredited from  til .
He got in contact with Gamal Abdel Nasser who became Godparent of his son Gamal.
In 1967, Albert Margai arranged his nomination as chief justice of Sierra Leone.
But Albert Margai lost the election in 1967 and Collier lost his office as chief justice.
In 1967 when the Siaka Stevens government followed Collier migrated to New York City where he took a teaching appointment at New York University.
Collier's granddaughter Napheesa Collier won a gold medal in basketball at the 2020 Summer Olympics.

References

1927 births
1994 deaths
Ambassadors of Sierra Leone to the United States
Permanent Representatives of Sierra Leone to the United Nations
Chief justices of Sierra Leone
Sierra Leone Creole people
People from Freetown
Fourah Bay College alumni